Yongji railway station is a railway station in Yongji, Yuncheng, Shanxi, China. It is an intermediate stop on the Datong–Puzhou railway. It handles passengers and freight. The station was originally called Zhaoyi, its name was changed in 1957.

References 

Railway stations in Shanxi